Arturo Bastes y Mandin (born on 1 April 1944 in Loboc, Bohol) is a Filipino Roman Catholic bishop. He was first ordained a priest of Society of the Divine Word (SVD) on November 28, 1970 in Rizal Park. Pope John Paul II appointed him Bishop of Romblon on July 3, 1997. His episcopal ordination was on Aug. 21, 1997 in Cebu City. The pope nominated him Coadjutor Bishop in the Diocese of Sorsogon on July 25, 2002. On April 17, 2003, (Holy Thursday), he succeeded as Bishop of Sorsogon.

References

1944 births
Living people
21st-century Roman Catholic bishops in the Philippines
Roman Catholic bishops of Romblon
20th-century Roman Catholic bishops in the Philippines